Petar Petrov may refer to:

 Petar Petrov (footballer, born 1961), Bulgarian football defender
 Petar Petrov (footballer, born 1984), Bulgarian football midfielder
 Petar Petrov (footballer, born 1988), Bulgarian football goalkeeper
 Petar Petrov (sprinter) (born 1955), Bulgarian runner
 Petar Petrov (weightlifter) (born 1974), Bulgarian weightlifter
 Peter Petroff (1919–2003), Bulgarian-American inventor
 Peter Petroff (communist) (1884–1947), Russian communist activist